Moustafa El-Shalakani (born 1933) is an Egyptian weightlifter. He competed in the men's featherweight event at the 1960 Summer Olympics.

References

1933 births
Living people
Egyptian male weightlifters
Olympic weightlifters of Egypt
Weightlifters at the 1960 Summer Olympics
People from Beni Suef Governorate